Andorra competed at the 2020 Summer Olympics in Tokyo. Originally scheduled to take place from 24 July to 9 August 2020, the Games were postponed to 23 July to 8 August 2021, because of the COVID-19 pandemic. It is the nation's twelfth consecutive appearance at the Summer Olympics.

Competitors
The following is the list of number of competitors in the Games.

Athletics

Andorra received universality slots from IAAF to send a male track and field athlete to the Olympics.

Track & road events

Canoeing

Slalom
Andorra qualified one boat through the 2019 ICF Canoe Slalom World Championships in La Seu d'Urgell, Spain, marking the country's return to the sport after a twelve-year absence.

References

Nations at the 2020 Summer Olympics
2020
2021 in Andorran sport